Corene Uzzell (1889–1938) was an American film actress of the silent era.

In 1905, Uzzell acted with the Murray and Mack company. Film studios for which she worked included Essanay, Famous Players, Mirror, and Pathe.

Selected filmography
 Seven Keys to Baldpate (1917)
 On Trial (1917)
 The Song of Songs (1918)
 A Woman of Impulse (1918)
 Conquered Hearts (1918)
 The Oakdale Affair (1919)
 Thunderbolts of Fate (1919)
The Invisible Ray (1920)
 Determination (1922)
 Mr. Potter of Texas (1922)

References

Bibliography
 Goble, Alan. The Complete Index to Literary Sources in Film. Walter de Gruyter, 1999.

External links

American film actresses
1889 births
1938 deaths
People from Houston